Aage Jensen may refer to:

 Aage Jensen (rowing) (1915–1995), Danish rowing coxswain
 Aage Rou Jensen (1924–2009), Danish international footballer